North Carolina's 22nd Senate district is one of 50 districts in the North Carolina Senate. It has been represented by Democrat Mike Woodard since 2013.

Geography
Since 2022, the district has included part of Durham County. The district overlaps with the 2nd, 29th, 30th, and 31st state house districts.

District officeholders

Election results

2022

2020

2018

2016

2014

2012

2010

2008

2006

2004

2002

2000

References

North Carolina Senate districts
Durham County, North Carolina